The canton of Givet is an administrative division of the Ardennes department, northern France. Its borders were not modified at the French canton reorganisation which came into effect in March 2015. Its seat is in Givet.

It consists of the following communes:

Aubrives
Charnois
Chooz
Foisches
Fromelennes
Givet
Ham-sur-Meuse
Hierges
Landrichamps
Rancennes
Vireux-Molhain
Vireux-Wallerand

References

Cantons of Ardennes (department)